Cycnoches loddigesii is a species of orchid. It is the type species of the genus Cycnoches.

References

loddigesii